Heinrich von Breymann (died 1777) was a German lieutenant colonel from the Principality of Brunswick-Wolfenbüttel who fought in the American Revolutionary War. He was commander of the Breymann Grenadiers, a Brunswick battalion hired into British service, and served under the command of John Burgoyne. During the Battles of Saratoga, Breymann's unit was driven behind a redoubt, where he grew frustrated at the poor performance of his men, attacking four with his saber before he was killed by one of his own men.

References

Year of birth missing
1777 deaths
Brunswick military personnel of the American Revolutionary War
British military personnel killed in the American Revolutionary War